Altay Volleyball Club is a Kazakh volleyball club that plays at the Kazakhstan National Liga.

Altay's predecessor, Ust-Kamenogorsk VC was formed in 2005 which merged with Semey VC in 2015 to establish the Altay Volleyball Club. The club has been successful at the Kazakhstan Volleyball Championship being crowned six times by 2016.

They participated at the 2016 Asian Men's Club Volleyball Championship where they finished fifth, and the Women's team finished fourth in three straight Asian Women's Club Volleyball Championships, 2016, 2017 and 2018.

Honours
Women's
Kazakhstan Volleyball Championship
Champions (6): 2009-2010, 2010-2011, 2011-2012, 2012-2013, 2014-2015, 2015-2016,2016-2017,2017-2018
Runners-up (1): 2008-2009

Kazahstan Spartakiad
Runners-up (1): 2015

Rosters
Roster in the 2021 FIVB Volleyball Women's Club World Championship.	

Head coach: Marko Grisic

2018 Asian Club Championship

Head coach:  Iurii Panchenko

Team roster 2017—2018

Notable players

Domestic players

 Alessya Safronova
 Inna Matveyeva
 Evgenia Ilina
 Yelena Ezau
 Irina Lukomskaya

Foreign players

 Raymariely Santos

 Piyanut Pannoy

 Viktoriya Lokhmanchuk

 Bojana Radulović
 Jovana  Brakočević
 Bojana Milenković

 Daria Ostrovskaïa

References

Kazakhstani volleyball clubs
Volleyball clubs established in 2005
2005 establishments in Kazakhstan